Events from the year 1803 in France.

Incumbents
 The French Consulate

Events
30 January 
Monroe and Livingston sail for Paris to discuss, and possibly buy, New Orleans: they end completing the Louisiana Purchase.
Napoleon authorizes the celebration of a Joan of Arc feast in Orléans on 8 May.
30 April - Louisiana Purchase made by the United States from France.
May - The First Consul of France Citizen Bonaparte begins making preparations to invade England.
18 May - The United Kingdom redeclares war on France, after French refuse to withdraw from Dutch territory.
5 July - Convention of Artlenburg, the surrender of the Electorate of Hanover to Napoleon's army.
18 November - Haitian Revolution: Battle of Vertières, decisive Haitian victory over the French colonial army.

Births

January to June
16 February - Louis-Antoine Garnier-Pagès, politician (died 1878)
3 March - Alexandre-Gabriel Decamps, painter (died 1860)
15 March - Alexandre Boreau, pharmacist and botanist (died 1875)
7 April - Flora Tristan, socialist writer and activist (died 1844)
24 April - Jean Étienne Bercé, entomologist (died 1879)
24 May - Charles Lucien Bonaparte, naturalist and ornithologist (died 1857)

July to December
22 July - Eugène Isabey, painter, draftsman, and printmaker (died 1886)
24 July - Adolphe Adam, composer and music critic (died 1856)
8 September - Léon Faucher, politician and economist (died 1854)
12 September - Julien Auguste Pélage Brizeux, poet (died 1858)
13 September - Jean Ignace Isidore Gérard, caricaturist (died 1847)
23 September - Jacques Crétineau-Joly, journalist and historian (died 1875)
28 September - Ferdinand Berthier, deaf educator, intellectual and political organiser (died 1886)
28 September - Prosper Mérimée, dramatist, historian and archaeologist (died 1870)
11 December - Hector Berlioz, composer (died 1869)
24 December - Jean-Rémy Bessieux, founder of Roman Catholic mission in Gabon and first Bishop there (died 1876)

Full date unknown
Hélène Jégado, domestic servant and serial killer, executed (died 1852)

Deaths

January to June
18 January - Sylvain Maréchal, essayist, poet and philosopher (born 1750)
29 January - La Clairon, actress (born 1723)
9 February - Jean François de Saint-Lambert, poet (born 1716)
11 February - Jean-François de La Harpe, playwright, writer and critic (born 1739)
16 February - Louis René Édouard, cardinal de Rohan, Cardinal (born 1734)
20 February - Marie Dumesnil, actress (born 1713)
4 March - Madame de Marsan, Royal children's governess (born 1720)
24 April - Adélaïde Labille-Guiard, painter (born 1749)
April - Louis François Antoine Arbogast, mathematician (born 1759)
29 May - Louis-Antoine Caraccioli, writer, poet, historian and biographer (born 1719)
6 June - Louis Gallodier, ballet dancer and choreographer (b. c1734)

July to December
16 August - Gabriel Sénac de Meilhan, writer (born 1736)
5 September
François Devienne, composer and flautist (born 1759)
Pierre Choderlos de Laclos, General and novelist (born 1741)
7 October - Pierre Vachon, composer (born 1731)
12 October - Jacques Gamelin, painter and engraver (born 1738)
7 November - Pierre Brugière, priest and Jansenist (born 1730)
27 November - Antoine Guenée, priest and Christian apologist (born 1717)

See also

References

1800s in France